Tuxedo Park School is an independent day school located in Tuxedo Park, New York, United States and serving the surrounding counties in both New York and New Jersey. The school enrolls students in pre-school up to the 9th grade (now known as the 'Freshman' year).

History 
Founded in 1900 for the purpose of educating children living in Tuxedo Park (having been founded in 1886 by Pierre Lorillard), the institution grew from a staff of two with 38 pupils from the outset to a current 219 students, sporting an average student-to-teacher ratio of 7:1.

Under the leadership of Anthony Barber in the early 1940s, the school received a New York State Charter and became an official not-for-profit institution.

Since the late 1950s the school has occupied a brick mansion house styled in the fashion of an English manor, formerly owned by John and Natalie Blair. The building is therefore referred to as 'Blairhame' in their memory.

Academics 
Small by design, the school maintains a low student-teacher ratio. The curriculum includes a blend of core academics, foreign language, fine and performing arts, athletics, community service, environmental stewardship, and character education.

Athletics and competition 
All Upper school (Grades 7, 8, and 9) and 6th grade students are required to engage in an interscholastic sport while attending the school, options which include soccer, field hockey, volleyball, both girls and boys lacrosse, basketball, and track and field, along with various other sport options, such as fitness or yoga.

Intra-scholastic competition is constructed around the annual Green and Gold competition. At the end of second grade, students are placed on a team, which competes each year in a multitude of activities, ranging from spelling bees to various artistic events, culminating in a grand athletic finale known as 'Field Day', often being the final determiner of a team's success.

Heads of School

19001914 -  Leon D. Bonnet
19141941 -  Arthur and Carolyn Eneboe
19411943 -  Anthony V. Barber
19431949 -  William W. Yardley
19491959 -  Philip Potter
19591962 -  Samuel Hazard
19621980 -  John A. Shepard
19801988 -  Andrew J. McLaren
19881994 -  M. Patricia Bayliss
19942011 -  James Burger
20112015 -  Kathleen McNamara
2015Present - Todd Stansbery

See also
Tuxedo, New York

References

External links 
 

Schools in New York (state)